Ottoville High School is a public high school in Ottoville, Ohio. It is the only high school in the Ottoville Local School district. Their nickname is the Big Green. They are a member of the Putnam County League.

References

External links
 District Website

High schools in Putnam County, Ohio
Public high schools in Ohio